is a Japanese professional footballer who plays as a centre back for J1 League club Urawa Red Diamonds.

Career statistics

Club

Honours

Club
Urawa Red Diamonds
Japanese Super Cup: 2022

References

External links

Profile at Urawa Red Diamonds

1997 births
Living people
People from Naha
Association football people from Okinawa Prefecture
Kindai University alumni
Japanese footballers
Association football defenders
J1 League players
J2 League players
FC Ryukyu players
Urawa Red Diamonds players